The El Mozote massacre took place both in and around the village of El Mozote, in the Morazán Department, El Salvador, on December 11 and 12, 1981, when the Salvadoran Army killed more than 811 civilians during the Salvadoran Civil War. The army had arrived in the village on the 10th, following clashes with guerrillas in the area. The Salvadoran Army's Atlácatl Battalion was responsible for the massacre. 

In December 2011, the government of El Salvador apologized for the massacre, the largest in the Americas in modern times.

Background 
In 1981, various left-wing guerrilla groups coalesced into the Farabundo Martí National Liberation Front to do battle against El Salvador's military dictatorship, the Revolutionary Government Junta of El Salvador.

Prior to the massacre, unlike many villages in the area, El Mozote had a reputation for neutrality. While many of its neighbors were largely Catholic, and were therefore often influenced by liberation theology and sympathetic to the guerrillas, El Mozote was largely Evangelical Protestant. The village had sold some supplies to the guerrillas but it was also "a place where the guerrillas had learned not to look for recruits".

Prior to the massacre, the town's wealthiest man, Marcos Díaz, had gathered the citizens in order to warn them that the army would soon pass through the area in a counterinsurgency operation, but he had been assured that the town's residents would not be harmed if they remained in place. Concerned that fleeing the town would cause them to be mistaken for guerrillas, the townspeople chose to stay and they also extended an offer of protection to peasants from the surrounding area, who soon flooded the town.

Massacre
In his 1994 book, The Massacre at El Mozote, American journalist Mark Danner compiled various reports in order to reconstruct an account of the massacre:

December 10
On the afternoon of December 10, 1981, units of the Salvadoran Army's Atlácatl Battalion, which was created in 1980 at the U.S. Army's School of the Americas, arrived at the remote village of El Mozote after a clash with guerrillas in the vicinity. The Atlácatl was a "rapid deployment infantry battalion" specially trained for counter-insurgency warfare. It was the first unit of its kind in the Salvadoran armed forces and was trained by United States military advisors. Its mission, Operación Rescate ("Operation Rescue"), was to eliminate the rebel presence in a small region of northern Morazán where the FMLN had two camps and a training centre.

El Mozote consisted of about 20 houses on open ground around a square. Facing onto the square was a church and, behind it, was a small building which was known as "the convent", the priest used it to change into his vestments when he came to the village to celebrate Mass. Near the village was a small schoolhouse.

Upon their arrival in the village, the soldiers discovered that, in addition to being filled with its residents, the village was also filled with campesinos who had fled from the surrounding area and sought refuge in it. The soldiers ordered everyone to leave their houses and go into the square. They made people lie face down and searched them and questioned them about the guerrillas. They then ordered the villagers to lock themselves in their houses until the next day and warned them that anyone who came out would be shot. The soldiers remained in the village during the night.

December 11 and 12
Early the next morning, the soldiers reassembled the entire village in the square. They separated the men from the women and children, divided them into separate groups and locked them in the church, the convent, and various houses.

During the morning, they proceeded to interrogate, torture, and execute the men in several locations. Around noon, they began taking the women and older girls in groups, separating them from their children and murdering them with machine guns after raping them. Girls as young as 10 were raped, and soldiers were reportedly heard bragging about how they especially liked the 12-year-old girls. Finally, they killed the children, at first by slitting their throats, and later by hanging them from trees; one child killed in this manner was reportedly two years old. After killing the entire population, the soldiers set fire to the buildings.

The soldiers remained in El Mozote that night but, the next day, went to the village of Los Toriles and carried out a further massacre. Men, women, and children were taken from their homes, lined up, robbed, and shot, and their homes then set ablaze.

Initial reports and controversy
News of the massacre first appeared in the world media on January 27, 1982, in reports published by The New York Times and The Washington Post. Raymond Bonner wrote in the Times of seeing "the charred skulls and bones of dozens of bodies buried under burned-out roofs, beams, and shattered tiles". The villagers gave Bonner a list of 733 names, mostly children, women, and old people, all of whom, they claimed, had been murdered by government soldiers.

Alma Guillermoprieto of the Post, who visited the village separately a few days later, wrote of "dozens of decomposing bodies still seen beneath the rubble and lying in nearby fields, despite the month that has passed since the incident... countless bits of bones—skulls, rib cages, femurs, a spinal column—poked out of the rubble".

Both reporters cited Rufina Amaya, a witness who had escaped into a tree during the attack. She told the reporters that the army had killed her husband and her four children (the youngest of whom was eight months old) and had then lit the bodies on fire.

Salvadoran Army and government leaders denied the reports and officials of the Reagan administration called them "gross exaggerations". The Associated Press reported that "the U.S. Embassy disputed the reports, saying its own investigation had found... that no more than 300 people had lived in El Mozote."

The conservative organization Accuracy in Media accused the Times and Post of timing their stories to release them just before the congressional debate. Five months later, Accuracy in Media devoted an entire edition of its AIM Report to Bonner in which its editor Reed Irvine declared, "Mr. Bonner had been worth a division to the communists in Central America." Assistant Secretary of State for Inter-American Affairs Thomas O. Enders attacked Bonner and Guillermoprieto before a Senate committee, stating that there had been a battle between guerrillas and the army, but "no evidence could be found to confirm that government forces systematically massacred civilians." Enders also repeated the claim that only 300 people had lived in El Mozote, and it was impossible for the death toll to have reached that reported in the Times and Post stories.

On February 8, Elliott Abrams, assistant secretary of state for human rights and humanitarian affairs, told the committee that "it appears to be an incident that is at least being significantly misused, at the very best, by the guerrillas."

In February, in an editorial, "The Media's War", The Wall Street Journal criticized Bonner's reporting as "overly credulous" and "out on a limb". In Time magazine, William A. Henry III wrote a month later, "An even more crucial if common oversight is the fact that women and children, generally presumed to be civilians, can be active participants in guerrilla war. New York Times correspondent Raymond Bonner underplayed that possibility, for example, in a much-protested January 27 report of a massacre by the army in and around the village of [El] Mozote." The first U.S. Ambassador to El Salvador of Ronald Reagan's presidency, Deane R. Hinton, called Bonner an "advocate journalist". Bonner was recalled to New York in August and later left the paper.

Although attacked less vigorously than Bonner, Guillermoprieto was also a target of criticism. A Reagan official wrote a letter to the Post stating that she had once worked for a communist newspaper in Mexico, which Guillermoprieto denied.

Later investigation 
On October 26, 1990, a criminal complaint was filed against the Atlácatl Battalion for the massacre by Pedro Chicas Romero of La Joya. Romero had survived the massacre himself by hiding in a cave above the town.

In 1992, as part of the peace settlement established by the Chapultepec Peace Accords signed in Mexico City on January 16 of that year, the United Nations-sanctioned Truth Commission for El Salvador investigating human rights abuses committed during the war, supervised the exhumations of the El Mozote's remains by the Argentine Forensic Anthropology Team (EAAF), beginning November 17. The excavation confirmed the previous reports of Bonner and Guillermoprieto that hundreds of civilians had been killed on the site.

The Salvadoran minister of defense and the chief of the armed forces joint staff informed the truth commission that they had no information that would make it possible to identify the units and officers who participated in Operación Rescate. They claimed that there were no records for the period. The truth commission stated in its final report:

In 1993, El Salvador passed an amnesty law for all individuals implicated by UN investigations, which effectively exempted the army from prosecution. That year, Danner published an article in the December 6 issue of The New Yorker. His article, "The Truth of El Mozote", caused widespread consternation, as it rekindled the debate regarding the United States' role in Central America during the violence-torn 1970s and 1980s. He subsequently expanded the article into a book, The Massacre at El Mozote (1994). In a prefatory remark, Danner wrote:

In 1993, a special state department panel that examined the actions of U.S. diplomats vis-à-vis human rights in El Salvador concluded that "mistakes were certainly made... particularly in the failure to get the truth about the December 1981 massacre at El Mozote." In his study of the media and the Reagan administration, On Bended Knee, U.S. author Mark Hertsgaard wrote of the significance of the first reports of the massacre:

What made the Morazan massacre stories so threatening was that they repudiated the fundamental moral claim that undergirded US policy. They suggested that what the United States was supporting in Central America was not democracy but repression. They therefore threatened to shift the political debate from means to ends, from how best to combat the supposed Communist threat—send US troops or merely US aid?—to why the United States was backing state terrorism in the first place.

A later court decision overturned the amnesty for defendants suspected of "egregious human rights violations" but attempts by Salvadoran lawyers to reopen the case repeatedly failed.

Legacy
On March 7, 2005, the Inter-American Commission on Human Rights of the Organization of American States reopened an investigation into the El Mozote massacre based on the evidence found by the Argentine forensic anthropologists. As of December 2011, activists continued to lobby the Inter-American Court of Human Rights to hear the case.

In a January 2007 report in The Washington Post, a former Salvadoran soldier, José Wilfredo Salgado, told of returning to El Mozote several months after the massacre and collecting the skulls of the youngest victims, whose remains were exposed by recent rains, for "candleholders and good-luck charms".

In December 2011, the Salvadoran government formally apologized for the massacre, in a ceremony in the town. Foreign Minister Hugo Martinez, speaking on the government's behalf, called the massacre the "blindness of state violence" and asked for forgiveness.

In October 2012, the Inter-American Court of Human Rights ordered El Salvador to investigate the El Mozote massacre and bring those responsible to justice. The court ruled that an amnesty law did not cover the killings.

On June 2, 2019, newly sworn in President of El Salvador, Nayib Bukele, ordered the removal of Colonel Domingo Monterrosa's name from the Third Infantry Brigade barracks in San Miguel.  The United Nations blamed Colonel Monterrosa for ordering the El Mozote massacre.

2016 reopening of inquiry 
In 2016, Judge Jorge Guzmán reopened the judicial inquiry into the massacre, following the overturning of the amnesty law by the Salvadoran Supreme Court. However, the inquiry faced obstruction from the Bukele administration. President Bukele ordered the army to block Guzmán from executing a search warrant at the military archives and barracks and further accused Guzmán and the families of the victims of being part of a plot against his government. 

In April 2021, Stanford professor Terry Karl testified before the inquiry that United States military advisor Allen Bruce Hazelwood was likely present during the massacre, based on documents and interviews. According to Karl, Hazelwood was with Colonel Monterrosa at the Atlácatl barracks at the start of the massacre, and accompanied Monterrosa by helicopter to the ongoing massacre. Karl alleged that the United States government engaged in a "sophisticated cover-up operation" to conceal the massacre and American presence. Karl also revealed that in 1982, Assistant Secretary of State for Human Rights Elliot Abrams told the director of Human Rights Watch about the presence of an American advisor at El Mozote in private conversation. Hazelwood denied the allegations of being present during the massacre, stating that he was actually 100 miles away training soldiers of the Atlácatl Battalion at the time.

In September 2021, the inquiry was effectively ended as Guzmán was removed as judge and forced to retire by Bukele following judicial reforms many saw as being targeted against the inquiry. Guzmán and other judges who opposed his firing have since faced harassment and retaliation by unknown perpetrators, the police, and government officials

See also
Anti-communist mass killings
Central American crisis
El Calabozo massacre
Human rights in El Salvador
La Matanza 
List of massacres in El Salvador
1985 Zona Rosa attacks
El Salvador–United States relations
Latin America–United States relations
List of conflicts in South America
Right-wing terrorism

References

Bibliography

Further reading
Mark Danner, The Massacre at El Mozote, New York: Vintage, 1994, 303 pages.

External links
 The UN Truth Commission report on El Mozote (excerpts)
 Testimony of Rufina Amaya: Sole survivor of the massacre (in Spanish)
  – list of names initially compiled by Tutela Legal, a church-run human rights group in El Salvador, and updated by Mark Danner, author of The Massacre at El Mozote
 El Salvador judge reopens case of 1981 massacre at El Mozote. The Guardian. 1 October 2016.
 A Massacre in El Salvador's Morazan Province: December 7–17, 1981, a 1982 pamphlet.
Remember El Mozote. Jacobin. December 12, 2016.
El Salvador general admits army carried out El Mozote massacre. Al Jazeera. January 25, 2020.

1981 in El Salvador
Massacres in 1981
Human rights in the Americas
Human rights abuses in El Salvador
Human rights in Central America
Massacres in El Salvador
Military scandals
Reagan administration controversies
Salvadoran Civil War
Morazán Department
December 1981 events in North America